Dovchinsürengiin Ganzorig (born 1971) is a Mongolian Armed Forces Lieutenant General who currently serves as the Chief of the General Staff of the Mongolian Armed Forces.

Early life and education 
Ganzorig was born in Mongolia in 1971. He graduated from the Tambov Higher Military Command Academy of Chemical Defense in 1995 and was commissioned as an infantry officer in the Mongolian Armed Forces. From 1999-2000, D.Ganzorig attended courses at the Chinese Special Forces School. From 2001-2002, he was enrolled in United States Infantry Officer Course as well as U.S. Army Ranger School. He is the first Mongolian officer to complete the United States Army Ranger School. He graduated from the United States Marine Corps Command and Staff College and from the U.S. Army War College with a Master of Strategic Studies degree in 2012. As a partial fulfilment of his degree, D.Ganzorig wrote a research project on "Mongolia’s Third Neighbor Policy: Impact on the Mongolian Armed Forces."

Career 
From 1995-1997, he was a platoon commander in the 119th Armed Forces Unit, and from 1997-2002, was a trainer in the Special Task Battalion 150 of the Mongolian Armed Forces. D.Ganzorig participated in numerous UN peacekeeping and other peace support operations such as the United Nations Mission for the Referendum in Western Sahara, United Nations Mission in Sierra Leone, United Nations Mission in Liberia, and Operation Iraqi Freedom. From 2002-2003, he was deputy head of the Peace Support Operations Training Center at the Unit 311, Joint Training Center of the Mongolian Armed Forces as well as head of the Center from 2008-2010.

From 2012-2014, he was Chief of Operational Directorate of the General Staff of the Armed Forces. Following the resignation of Major General Ayushiin Ganbat, President Khaltmaagiin Battulga appointed D.Ganzorig to the post of Chief of the General Staff with the consent of the State Great Khural on October 4, 2019.

Awards and decorations

References 

1971 births
Living people
Mongolian military personnel
United States Army War College alumni
Peacekeeping missions and operations involving the United Nations
United States Army Command and General Staff College alumni